The Olot Saints Museum opened in 2007 in Olot (Girona), and is devoted to housing items related to the craft of creating religious imagery. With the aim of broadening its appeal, it also includes other crafts, popular and traditional culture, and the life and work of Marian Vayreda, one of the founders of the first workshops to make religious figurines in the city, along with his brother Joaquim and Josep Berga i Boix. The workshop was known as, "Arte Cristiano" (Christian Art).

Marià Vayreda, painter and writer, lived on the first floor of the Museum, where he wrote the novel "La punyalada" (The stab), a masterpiece of Catalan literature.

The Museum is housed in a 19th-century Gothic Revival building known as "Arte Cristiano". Construction began in 1890 following the designs of the modernist architect Joaquim Codina i Matalí, commissioned by Joaquim Vayreda.

References

This article is partially or entirely extracted from the website "Visitmuseum" of the Agència Catalana del Patrimoni Cultural. The text was placed by the author or the person in charge of publication under the Creative Commons Attribution-ShareAlike License or a compatible license.

External links

Olot
Buildings and structures in the Province of Girona
Religious museums in Spain
2007 establishments in Spain